The Good Beer Guide is a book published annually by the Campaign for Real Ale (CAMRA) listing what it considers to be the best 4,500 real ale outlets (pubs, clubs, and off-licences) in the United Kingdom.

Details

The content of the guide is decided upon by volunteers in CAMRA's 200-plus local branches. Throughout the preceding year CAMRA members anonymously rate the quality of the cellarmanship of beer in venues using CAMRA's National Beer Scoring System (NBSS) through either WhatPub or the Good Beer Guide app. These scores are then reviewed by local volunteers in the spring who put forward those they consider to serve the best real ale. The number of entries each branch area has is decided at county level with an emphasis on ensuring that a geographically wide spread set of entries are included in each year's Guide. 

Entries for each venue give details on factual information such as opening times, food availability and accessibility of the property, as well as subjective information such as the attractiveness of the wallpaper and the welcome visitors are likely to get from the bar staff. 

The Guide also includes a list of real ale breweries in the United Kingdom, with lists and tasting notes on their beers.

After two long stints as Editor, Roger Protz announced in autumn 2017 that the 2018 Guide would be his last. CAMRA stated that from the 2019 Guide it would carry the name of the managing editor.

The Good Beer Guide 2023 featured a foreword by HRH The Prince of Wales.

History
The guide was first published in 1972 and was just 18 pages long. 
Rather than a professionally published volume, it was a collection of sheets of paper stapled together and posted out to CAMRA members.

The first printed edition was published in 1974, and contained the comment on Watney's brewery: "Avoid like the plague", which generated a lot of media attention and caused the publisher, Waddington, to recall the first print run and revise the description to "Avoid at all costs".

Editions
The guide is published each year, occasionally with multiple bindings:

Other publications
In the past, CAMRA also published the Good Cider Guide and the Good Bottled Beer Guide.

References

External links
CAMRA website

Beer journalism
Works about beer
Beer in the United Kingdom
Hospitality industry in the United Kingdom
Pubs in the United Kingdom
British books
1972 non-fiction books
Books about food and drink
British cuisine